Delaware's state elections were held on November 8, 2016.

All 41 seats of the Delaware House of Representatives, 11 seats (out of 21) of the Delaware Senate, as well as the offices of Governor of Delaware, Lieutenant Governor of Delaware, and the State Insurance commissioner, were up for election.

Federal

President

House of Representatives

State

Constitutional officers

Governor

Lieutenant Governor

Insurance Commissioner

General Assembly

Summary
Senate

House of Representatives

Senate

House of Representatives

Source: Delaware Department of Elections, Ballotpedia

References

 
Delaware